Asura pinkurata is a moth of the family Erebidae. It was described by Lars Kühne in 2007. It is found in Uganda.

References

Endemic fauna of Uganda
Moths described in 2007
pinkurata
Insects of Uganda
Moths of Africa